EFF or eff may refer to:

Politics 
 Economic Freedom Fighters, a South African communist political party
 Economic Freedom Fund, an American political organization
 Election Fighting Fund, a British suffragist organization supporting the early Labour Party
 Electronic Frontier Foundation, a US-based international digital rights group
 Evergreen Freedom Foundation, an American political think tank

Other uses 
 Eff (duo), a German musical duo
 Eff (programming language), a functional programming language with focus on algebraic effects
 Efficiency (basketball), a statistical benchmark
 Effingham Junction railway station, Surrey, England, National Rail station code
 The Electronic Font Foundry, a British computer type foundry
 Emmett/Furla Films, now Emmett/Furla Oasis Films, an American production company
 Environmental Film Festival in the Nation's Capital, in Washington, D.C., United States
 Ethiopian Football Federation
 Extrusion freeform fabrication, a method for fabricating functionally graded material
 F, a letter of the alphabet
 Fuck

See also 
 F (disambiguation)